Matt Seeberger (born August 10, 1984) is an American tennis player.

Seeberger has a career high ATP singles ranking of 1200 achieved on August 3, 2015. He also has a career high ATP doubles ranking of 155 achieved on July 27, 2015.

Partnering Julio Peralta in 2015, Seeberger won the US Open National Playoffs awarding the pair a wildcard into the main draw of the 2015 US Open men's doubles event.

External links
 
 

1984 births
Living people
American male tennis players
University of California, Santa Cruz alumni
Tennis players from San Francisco